Temnora plagiata is a moth of the family Sphingidae. It is found in Africa.

The forewing outer margin is bisinuate, strongly convex in the middle and feebly denticulate. The underside of the abdomen has two series of brown dots. The forewing upperside has a conspicuous strongly curved brown antemedian band, a discal spot, and a dark brown ring with a pale centre. There is also a large sharply defined quadrangular costal patch. The hindwing upperside is brownish-orange, the submarginal line brown, running continuous from the costa to the tornus but more weakly marked between veins. The marginal band is pale brown.

Subspecies
Temnora plagiata plagiata (South Africa)
Temnora plagiata fuscata Rothschild & Jordan, 1903 (wooded habitats from Malawi to east and central Kenya and southern Ethiopia)

References

Temnora
Moths described in 1856
Moths of Africa